Leichosila wagneri is a moth of the subfamily Arctiinae first described by Christian Schmidt in 2009. It is only known from high-elevation forest (1,950 to 2,050 m) on Barva Volcano, Cordillera Central, Costa Rica.

The forewing length is about 13.5 mm.

References

Arctiini